Palmitoyltransferase ZDHHC3 is an enzyme that in humans is encoded by the ZDHHC3 gene that contains a DHHC domain.

References

Further reading